In a piston engine, the bore (or cylinder bore) is the diameter of each cylinder.

Engine displacement is calculated based on bore, stroke length and the number of cylinders: 
 displacement = 

The stroke ratio, determined by dividing the bore by the stroke, traditionally indicated whether an engine was designed for power at high engine speeds (rpm) or torque at lower engine speeds. The term "bore" can also be applied to the bore of a locomotive cylinder or steam engine pistons.

Steam locomotive 
The term bore also applies to the cylinder of a steam locomotive or steam engine.

See also

 Bore pitch
 Compression ratio
 Engine displacement

References

Engine technology